Potash and Perlmutter is a three-act play written by Montague Glass and Charles Klein, based on earlier short stories written by Glass. Producer Albert H. Woods staged it on Broadway, where it opened at the George M. Cohan Theatre on August 16, 1913. The play is a comedy featuring the characters Abe Potash and Mawruss Perlmutter, who are business partners in the garment industry.

The play was a hit and ran for 441 performances on Broadway. A production on London's West End opened on April 14, 1914, at the Queen's Theatre. By the fall of 1914, Woods had eight road companies presenting the show on tour.

The play was adapted as a 1923 movie, also called Potash and Perlmutter. Woods produced several theatrical sequels, including Abe and Mawruss (1915), Business Before Pleasure (1917), His Honor: Abe Potash (1919), Partners Again (1922), and Potash and Perlmutter, Detectives (1926), all written by Glass with various co-authors.

Cast and characters
The characters and opening night cast from the Broadway production are listed below:

References

External links
 

1913 plays
Broadway plays
Comedy plays
American plays adapted into films
British plays adapted into films
Plays set in New York City
West End plays
Plays based on short fiction